Targobank AG (Proprietary notation: TARGOBANK) is a German bank mainly operating in the retail, business and corporate customer segments  and is headquartered in Düsseldorf. With 700 employees at its head office, Targobank is one of the larger banking employers in the Düsseldorf financial center. In Duisburg, the bank runs a customer center with 2,000 employees. In addition, there are administrative buildings in Mainz (factoring) and Düsseldorf (leasing & investment financing). Since 2008 it is part of the French Crédit Mutuel Alliance Féderale banking group. Before the bank was part of the American Citigroup which in 2010 became Citibank Privatkunden AG & Co. KGaA and until 1991 it had been active under the name Kundenkreditbank.

History
In 1926 the Kundenkreditbank (KKB) in East Prussian Königsberg was the first bank in Germany which offered loans to private consumers. In the same year the American The National City Bank of New York, which came out of the City Bank of New York founded in 1812, opened a branch in Berlin at Unter den Linden Boulevard in the course of its international expansion. In 1935 the KKB moved its headquarters to Düsseldorf. With the beginning of World War II the American bank closed its Berlin branch and since 1953 has a branch in Frankfurt am Main. After The National City Bank of New York merged with the First National Bank in 1955 it changed its name to First National City Bank (of New York). In 1973 The First National City Bank took over the KKB Kundenkreditbank in Germany and kept the name KKB for its German retail banking arm until the 1990s. Since 1976 The First National City Bank was active in the USA under the name Citibank and in 1991 the bank also renamed its German business to Citibank Privatkunden AG and in 2003 to Citibank Privatkunden AG & Co. KGaA. Since the early 2000s the German Citibank was known for giving out loans with too high interest to private customers with bad credit rating.

Acquisition and rebranding

In July 2008 it was announced that the French cooperative bank Crédit Mutuel Alliance Fédérale was going to buy the then crisis-shaken German retail banking branch of the Citibank. The price was 4.9 billion Euro and the in the financial year 2008 generated profits until the moment of takeover. In December 2008 Citibank sold its German branch to Crédit Mutuel Alliance Fédérale. The brands Citi, Citibank and Citibank with Arc Design were kept for a little while by Crédit Mutuel Alliance Fédérale under the license of the Citigroup Inc. Citibank itself with its wholesale banking under the name Citigroup Global Market Deutschland AG stayed in Frankfurt am Main.

On February 22, 2010 the Crédit Mutuel Alliance Fédérale subsidiary formally changed its name to Targobank and was re-structured by Crédit Mutuel Alliance Fédérale. The word Targo is purely an artificial word which was created for the business by ad writer Manfred Gotta and was meant to raise worldwide acceptance of the company.

Sponsorship
Targobank took over the sponsorship deal with Werder Bremen which was started by Citibank, after a transition message of "So geht Bank heute" ("That's how today's banking goes"). TARGOBANK has been an official partner of the DFB Cup since 2012.

Acquisition of a majority of the former Karstadt-Quelle-Bank Valovis
In December 2013 "Targobank" announced the acquisition of the retail banking arm of "Valovis Bank". Since May 30, 2014 especially the credit card business with around 800 000 customers belongs to Targobank. The system integration proceeded until mid-2016.

Acquisition of the GE Commercial Finance
In August 2016 the under the name GE Commercial Finance active leasing- and factoring business of the German GE Capital, a financial branch of the General Electric company, was acquired and ever since operates under the name Targo Commercial Finance.

Structure of the former Citibank
In Germany the Citibank was represented among others by the following corporations:
 Citibank Privatkunden AG & Co. KGaA headquartered in Düsseldorf which was formed in 2003 in a re-structuring process of the Citibank Privatkunden AG. In September 1991 the German Citicorp subsidy was active under the name Citicorp-TochterCitibank after it took over the Kundenkreditbank (KKB) and its customer base.
 Citicorp Dienstleistungs GmbH headquartered in Duisburg. In 1999 the Citicorp Dienstleistungs GmbH was founded as a subsidy of the Citibank Privatkunden AG. 
 Citicorp Deutschland GmbH in Düsseldorf as Management Holding of other corporations in Germany.
 In 2001 the founding of the Citifinanzberatung GmbH headquartered in Düsseldorf followed which employs mobile customer consultants. In 2006 it was the fastest growing subsidy. The number of staff of the Mobile Sales Force (as field workers are called at Citibank) amounted in the end of 2008 to around 230 staff members.

Online Banking/Mobile Banking
Targobank accounts can be managed online via e-banking or via a mobile phone app. In addition, accounts can be managed via phone calls with an interactive voice response. For transaction authorization a variety of TAN procedures are offered; one can choose between indexed TANs (iTAN), a mobile TAN (mTAN) via SMS and authorizing via app (easyTAN).

Others
With the Targobanks Girocard customers can also draw cash in France at Crédit Mutuel and Crédit Industriel et Commercial without charge as well as at Targobank in Spain and Beobank in Belgium.

Criticism
The image of the former Citibank in the German press was ambivalent. Admittedly Citibank was awarded as “most customer-oriented bank in Germany 2006” (awarded by the University of St. Gallen, the Handelsblatt and Steria Mummert Consulting), but at the same time it was regularly criticized due to its lending practice (e.g. consumer protection and Plusminus). Due to its bad image in 2004 Citibank initiated a new international campaign Unsere gemeinsame Verantwortlichkeit.

In the course of the breakdown of the American investment bank Lehman Brothers on September 15, 2008 the Citibank Germany once again received bad press. According to numerous media reports certificates by Lehman Brothers were sold especially in Citibank branches as a secure investment to private customers – among them many pensioners – who as a result were confronted with the total loss of their investment. It is said that in Germany alone about 50,000 people were affected and the majority were Citibank customers. According to media reports, financial experts accuse the Citibank as leading sales partner of Lehman Brothers of providing fresh capital for the investment bank by massively pushing sales of Lehman certificates in Germany.
On May 28, 2009 the Citibank announced a successful end after long negotiations with the consumer assistance office NRW, with which the bank agreed on a curtesy arrangement of 27 million Euros. This agreement was positively reflected on by the media, but the syndicate of Lehman-victims criticized the agreement as insufficient and mainly beneficial for the bank. They criticized that the curtesy offer would only equal 5% of the approximate total damage of 475 million Euros and even according to Citibanks own calculations around two thirds of damaged customers would get nothing. The compensation model looks at a multi-step refund of 30 up to 80% for those cases which are about existence threatening sums and it involves extensive exclusion criteria. The detailed criteria were published on the website of the consumer assistance office NRW.
In fall 2009 the consumer assistance office proved in random tests with 15 banks that they don't forward their massively dropped refinancing costs to their customers. For the Extra-Account of the Citibank the overdraft interest was 16.99%. In 2010 the consumer assistance office cautioned three banks due to their practice. One of the banks signed a declaration to cease and desist; against the other two – Targobank and Sparda-Bank Münster – the consumer assistance office went to court. In December 2011 the regional court Düsseldorf decided that the interest clause of the Targobank was illegitimate and the Targobanks try to have the judgment reversed by the Higher Regional Court failed.
Due to the rebranding of the Citibank into Targobank consumerists criticized in 2010 that the change from KKB to Citibank in 1991 didn't change the criticism of the credit business, the business model would only aim to find new credit users to turn them into long term debtors.

References

External links
 Official website 

Banks of Germany
Companies based in Düsseldorf
1926 establishments in Germany
Banks established in 1926
Crédit Mutuel